The following is an alphabetical list of members of the United States House of Representatives from the state of Hawaii.  For chronological tables of members of both houses of the United States Congress from the state (through the present day), see United States congressional delegations from Hawaii.  The list of names should be complete (as of January 3, 2015), but other data may be incomplete. It includes members who have represented both the state and the territory, both past and present.

Current members

Updated January 2023. 

 : Ed Case (D) (2002-2007, since 2019)
 : Jill Tokuda (D) (since 2023)

List of members and delegates

In film
The life and election of Patsy Mink and her role as co-author of Title IX is highlighted in the documentary film Rise of the Wahine, directed by Dean Kaneshiro.

See also

List of United States senators from Hawaii
United States congressional delegations from Hawaii
Hawaii's congressional districts

References

Hawaii
Representatives